Engjëll Cara (born 20 July 1965 in Kavajë) is a politician and former member of the Assembly of the Republic of Albania for the Democratic Party. He studied veterinary medicine and graduated from Tirana's University of Agriculture in 1987. Cara begin his career as a politician in 2001 when he won the elections for the leader of DP in Kavajë. He carried this post for eight years. In 2005 he was chosen Deputy in the Parliament of Albania. Engjëll Cara was elected for a second time as Democratic Party leader of Kavajë branch on 28 June 2014 defeating opponent Isa Sakja. He is married and has two daughters.

Career 
 1991- Member of Democratic Party
 1998-2001- Member of the Presidium of Branch PD, Kavaja
 1998-2009-Member of the National Council of DPA
 2001-2009-Chairman of the PD Branch, Kavaja
 2005-2009-Deputy in the Albanian Parliament of DPA
 2014-2016 Chairman of the PD Branch, Kavaja

References

Living people
Parliament members from Kavajë
1965 births
Democratic Party of Albania politicians
Members of the Parliament of Albania
Albanian veterinarians
Agricultural University of Tirana alumni
Engjëll